Solent Rescue is an independent inshore rescue lifeboat, not run by the RNLI, based at Lepe Country Park south of the New Forest, on the north shore of the Solent in the county of Hampshire in England.

Description 
This small independent rescue organisation was set up in 1971 as a beach rescue unit, and  has now developed into a full lifeboat station. The organisation operates within a specified area as agreed with Her Majesty's Coastguard. Solent Rescue is one of eight independent lifeboats who make up the Solent Sea Rescue Organisation; each of these units have equipment that is tailor-made or selected for their unique areas of operation.

History 
From 2011 until 2016, alterations were undertaken at Solent Rescue during this time including improvements to the clifftop weatherproof observation lookout. The main lifeboat was replaced with a 7.9-metre Delta rigid-hulled inflatable boat, powered by twin Suzuki DF90 lean burn engines which reduced response times.

On Season 1 Episode 5 of the Channel 5 programme Construction Squad: Operation Homefront which aired on 4 November 2013, the team behind the show helped Solent Rescue build a new boathouse.

In 2017 Solent Rescue received a £22,600 grant from the Minister of State for Transport as part of a five-year £5 million scheme for rescue boat teams. That sane year they raised over £100,000 to purchase a high speed rescue lifeboat which they received in Spring 2018. The lifeboat includes a cabin which allows crew to patrol for longer and in broader waters.

Furthermore, additional support assets were been purchased with the aim to be able to utilize these to assist in times of inland adverse weather conditions within Hampshire along with close SAR support to Lepe and Stanswood beach fronts.

In 2019 the neighbouring Sidmouth Lifeboat station donated an Arctic 24 boat that was known as the Pride of Sidmouth to Solent Rescue.

With a donation from Sidmouth lifeboat, Solent Rescue returned to operating an open RIB far superior to any such vessel that they had previously operated in addition to the D-class they are able to provide good coverage.

In 2020 the unit replaced its lookout post with a larger container to provide better quality crew area and improved views with wrap around windows at the front with permission from the New Forest National Park Authority. The larger space also provides more room for a first aid treatment area.

Most of the 2020 season had to be suspended due to the global COVID-19 pandemic.

In 2021, the year of the Solent Rescue's 50th anniversary, it was awarded the Queen's Award for Voluntary Service from Nigel Atkinson, the Lord Lieutenant of Hampshire. That same year, Solent Rescue was the beneficiary of a £17,000 grant on behalf of a fund set up in memory of Charles Burnett III, with the funds being used to improve their Arctic 24 boat and to obtain a new launch trailer.

In 2022 the unit received a £10,000 grant from the National Lottery Community Fund. The Community Fund described the Solent Rescue's work in the Western and Central Solent area as a vital service "in one of the busiest waterways in Europe."

Neighbouring station locations

References

External links
 

Lifeboat stations in Hampshire
Independent Lifeboat stations
Sea rescue organisations of the United Kingdom
The Solent
Organisations based in Hampshire
1971 establishments in England